Tripple 44 Football Academy is a football talent development hub and a youth football club out of Nigeria focused on the football development in the country.

History 
Tripple 44 Football Academy was founded in 2014 with just four players by Club Proprietor, Samuel Olatunji Okuku who also doubles as the club's Director of Sports. The club was officially registered and affiliated with the Nigerian Football Federation through the Oyo state Football Association in 2017 when it began full operations.

Located in the ancient city of Ibadan, Tripple 44 Football Academy runs a standard youth football System with international best practices, which is structured to develop young talents with the right developmental training module needed for them to meet up with the demands of a professional football career.

Tripple 44 Football Academy went on a 30 match unbeaten run which lasted for a period of 14 months before losing to the Golden Eaglets in June 2022.

The club has produced a number of players now plying their trade across various leagues globally.

Notable players 
In 2019, Peter Olawale, who is arguably the club's biggest product so far was selected to represent the Nigeria U-17 football team at the 2019 FIFA U-17 World Cup in Brazil. Olawale was profiled by FIFA before the tournament and was tipped to shine at the 2019 FIFA U-17 World Cup, where he scored in Nigeria's third match against Australia. He secured a deal to Hapoel Ra'nana in 2020 despite also being linked to Borussia Dortmund and Lille OSC.

After his second season in the Israeli Liga Alef North, playing for Hapoel Ra'nana, he moved to the Hungarian league to join Debreceni VSC.

More notable players include:

 Emmanuel Adeyemo - FC Vizela
 Abel Ogwuche - Trelleborg
 David Habila - Hapoel Ramat Gan
 Ozor Okeke - Nigeria U-17

Technical/Coaching Team

Management Team

References 

Football clubs in Nigeria
Sports organizations established in 2017